Rolf Kinzl, (19 October 1878 – 14 November 1938) was an Austrian tennis player, football player, and cyclist who was active during the beginning of the 20th century.

Tennis career
In 1898 he reached the final of the Austrian Championship but lost in four sets to Jorge André. In 1901 he won the Adriatic Championships in Triest in a three-set match. His opponent in the final had been Miklós Horthy who later became the Regent of Hungary.

In 1903 he won the international tournament of the Magyar Athletikai Club in Budapest with a victory over Josiah Ritchie. With his compatriot Kurt von Wessely he celebrated his first important doubles title in the German International Championships. In 1904 he was defeated in the semifinals of the Austrian Championship by Josiah Ritchie in straight sets. He and von Wessely also lost the doubles final to Herbert Roper-Barrett and B.W. Frost.

Kinzl played for the Austrian Davis Cup team during the 1905 World Group semifinal against Australasia. He lost both his singles matches against Norman Brookes and Anthony Wilding as well as the doubles match with his partner Kurt von Wessely. His best result at a Grand Slam tournament was reaching the third round at the 1907 Wimbledon Championships. In 1907 he was the finalist of the Budapest International Doubles Championships partnering von Wessely but eventually lost it to Tony Wilding and Oscar Kreuzer.

In May 1908 he was runner-up at the Wiesbaden Cup having lost the final in straight sets to Anthony Wilding. In July he participated in the singles event at the Summer Olympics but lost in the first round to Wilberforce Eaves. In 1912 he clinched the title of the inaugural Academic Sports Association international tournament in Wawel.

In 1913 he captured his second German International Championships doubles trophy in Hamburg alongside von Wessely. The same year they reached the semifinals of the World Hard Court Championships.

Other
In football, he played as the center-forward of the DFC Prague. He was an occasional football referee as well.

In civil life he was an editor-in-chief for a sport magazine called Wiener Sporttagblattes.

He died in Vienna on 14 November 1938 of a sudden heart attack.

References

External links

1878 births
1938 deaths
Sportspeople from Prague
Austrian male tennis players
Austrian footballers
Austrian male cyclists
Austrian football referees
Olympic tennis players of Austria
Tennis players at the 1908 Summer Olympics
Association footballers not categorized by position
DFC Prag players